The Energy Act 2004 (c 20) is an Act of the Parliament of the United Kingdom concerned with nuclear power, renewable and sustainable energy and energy regulation. Royal assent was granted on 22 July 2004.

Part 1

Chapter 1

Section 10
Section 10(2)(b) was substituted by paragraph 5 of Schedule 6 to the Environmental Authorisations (Scotland) Regulations 2018 (SI 2018/219).

Section 29
Sections 29(1)(b) and (c) were substituted by section 99(2)(b) of the Finance Act 2006. New sections 29(3) and (3A) were substituted for sections 29(3) and (4) by section 99(3) of the Finance Act 2006. Section 29(5A) was inserted by section 99(5) of the Finance Act 2006.

Section 30
Section 30(1)(b) was substituted by section 100(2)(a) of the Finance Act 2006. Section 30(1)(d) was inserted by section 100(2)(c) of the Finance Act 2006. Section 30(3) was substituted by section 100(3) of the Finance Act 2006.

Chapter 2

Section 44
Section 44(2)(d) was substituted by paragraph 436(b) of Schedule 1 to the Corporation Tax Act 2010. Section 44(2)(f) was substituted by paragraph 436(d) of Schedule 1 to the Corporation Tax Act 2010.

Chapter 3

Section 55
Section 55(5) was inserted by paragraph 11 of Schedule 7 to the Policing and Crime Act 2009.

Section 56A
This section was inserted by paragraph 3 of Schedule 2 to the Criminal Justice (Scotland) Act 2016 (Consequential Provisions) Order 2018 (SI 2018/46).

Section 57
This section was repealed by section 115(2) of, and Part 4 of Schedule 10 to, the Protection of Freedoms Act 2012.

Section 59
Paragraph (aa) of the definition of "chief officer" in section 59(3) was inserted by paragraph 44(2)(a)(ii) of Schedule 2 to the Police and Fire Reform (Scotland) Act 2012 (Consequential Provisions and Modifications) Order 2013 (SI 2013/602). Paragraphs (c) and (d) of the definition of "chief officer" in section 59(3) were repealed by Part 2 of Schedule 17 to the Serious Organised Crime and Police Act 2005.

Paragraph (aa) of the definition of "relevant force" in section 59(3) was inserted by paragraph 44(2)(b)(ii) of Schedule 2 to the Police and Fire Reform (Scotland) Act 2012 (Consequential Provisions and Modifications) Order 2013. Paragraphs (c) and (d) of the definition of "relevant force" in section 59(3) were repealed by Part 2 of Schedule 17 to the Serious Organised Crime and Police Act 2005.

Section 59A
This section was inserted by paragraph 199 of Schedule 4 to the Serious Organised Crime and Police Act 2005.

Section 68
Sections 68(4), (5) and (6) were repealed by paragraph 44(6) of Schedule 2 to the Police and Fire Reform (Scotland) Act 2012 (Consequential Provisions and Modifications) Order 2013.

Chapter 4
This Chapter consisted of sections 72 to 75. Sections 72 to 75 were repealed as to England and Wales by Schedule 28 to the Environmental Permitting (England and Wales) Regulations 2010 (SI 2010/675), and as to Scotland by paragraph 1 of Schedule 7 to the Environmental Authorisations (Scotland) Regulations 2018 (SI 2018/219).

Chapter 5

Section 78
Section 78(1) was repealed by paragraph 30 of Schedule 12 to the Energy Act 2013.

Part 2

Chapter 1

Section 81
Section 81(3) was repealed by section 108 of, and Schedule 6 to, the Energy Act 2008.

Chapter 2

Section 84
Section 84(4) was substituted by paragraph 4(2) of the Marine and Coastal Access Act 2009.

Section 95
New sections 95(1A) to (1C) were substituted for section 95(1A) by section 62(3) of the Scotland Act 2016. Section 95(1A)(b) was inserted by section 41(2)(d) of the Wales Act 2017. Sections 95(1D) and (1E) were inserted by section 41(3) of the Wales Act 2017.

Section 95(4A) was inserted by section 62(5) of the Scotland Act 2016. Sections 95(4B) and (4C) were inserted by section 41(4) of the Wales Act 2017.

Section 96
Section 96(8)(b) was inserted by section 62(8)(b) of the Scotland Act 2016.

Section 99
Sections 99(4) and (5) were repealed as to Scotland by paragraph 3 of Schedule 4 to the Marine (Scotland) Act 2010.

Chapter 3

Section 105
Sections 105(1A) to (1C) were inserted by section 62(9) of the Scotland Act 2016. Section 105(9) was repealed by section 108 of, and Schedule 6 to, the Energy Act 2008.

Section 105A
This section was inserted by section 69(4) of the Energy Act 2008.

Section 107
Sections 107(5) to (7) were repealed by section 108 of, and Schedule 6 to, the Energy Act 2008.

Section 108
Section 108(3A) was inserted by section 69(5) of the Energy Act 2008.

Sections 110A and 110B
Sections 110A and 110B were inserted by section 70(1) of the Energy Act 2008.

Section 111
Section 111(7)(b) was inserted by section 62(13)(b) of the Scotland Act 2016.

Section 112
Section 112(7)(b) was inserted by section 62(14)(b) of the Scotland Act 2016.

Section 112A
Section 112A was inserted by section 71 of the Energy Act 2008.

Chapter 4

Section 116
This section was repealed by section 108 of, and Schedule 6 to, the Energy Act 2008.

Section 121
Section 121(3) was inserted by section 40(1)(c) of the Energy Act 2008.

Section 121A
This section was inserted by regulation 2 of the Origin of Renewables Electricity (Power of Gas and Electricity Markets Authority to act for Northern Ireland Authority for Utility Regulation) Regulations 2008 (SI 2008/1888).

Chapter 5

Sections 125 to 125C
New sections 125 to 125C were substituted for section 125 by paragraph 2 of Schedule 7 to the Climate Change Act 2008.

Section 126
Sections 126(5) to (8) were inserted by paragraph 3 of Schedule 7 to the Climate Change Act 2008.

Sections 128
New sections 128(6) to(10) were substituted for sections 128(6) and (7) by paragraph 4 of Schedule 7 to the Climate Change Act 2008.

Section 129
Section 126(7) was substituted by paragraph 5 of Schedule 7 to the Climate Change Act 2008.

Sections 131A to 131C
Sections 131A to 131C were inserted by paragraph 6 of Schedule 7 to the Climate Change Act 2008.

Section 132
Section 132(3) was substituted by regulation 3 of the Energy Act 2004 (Amendment) Regulations 2012 (SI 2012/2723). Section 132(3A) was inserted by regulation 4 of the Energy Act 2004 (Amendment) Regulations 2012.

Part 3

Chapter 1

Section 137
Section 137(3)(za) was inserted by regulation 50(3) of the Electricity and Gas (Internal Markets) Regulations 2011 (SI 2011/2704). Section 137(3)(f) was inserted by section 65(3)(b) of the Energy Act 2013.

Chapter 3

Section 155
Sections 155(8) to (10) were inserted by section 48(3) of the Energy Act 2013.

Section 166
Section 166(3A) was inserted by section 93(2) of the Energy Act 2011. Section 166(6A) and (6B) were inserted by section 93(3) of the Energy Act 2011.

Section 171
Section 171(8) was substituted by paragraph 220(6) of Schedule 1 to the Companies Act 2006 (Consequential Amendments, Transitional Provisions and Savings) Order 2009 (SI 2009/1941).

Chapter 4

Section 180
Section 180(2) was repealed by section 108 of, and Schedule 6 to, the Energy Act 2008.

Section 184
Section 184 creates a scheme to reduce the cost of electricity distribution in areas with high electricity distribution costs. The AAHEDC scheme specifically covers the north of Scotland, currently the only area which receives assistance. Part of the tariff covers Shetland, and the remaining tariff covers the rest of the north of Scotland area. Tariffs for the scheme are published by 15 July each year but they take effect retrospectively from the preceding 1 April. The scheme is operated by National Grid Electricity System Operator (ESO), the national transmission system operator, a subsidiary of National Grid plc. The tariff in 2022/23 is 0.040670p per kwh.

Part 4

Section 198 - Short title, commencement and extent
The following orders have been made under this section:
The Energy Act 2004 (Commencement No. 1) Order 2004 (S.I. 2004/1973 (C. 87))
The Energy Act 2004 (Commencement No. 2) Order 2004 (S.I. 2004/2184 (C. 95))
The Energy Act 2004 (Commencement No. 3) Order 2004 (S.I. 2004/2575 (C. 110))
The Energy Act 2004 (Commencement No. 4) Order 2005 (S.I. 2005/442 (C. 20))
The Energy Act 2004 (Commencement No. 5) Order 2005 (S.I. 2005/877 (C. 38))
The Energy Act 2004 (Commencement No. 6) Order 2005 (S.I. 2005/2965 (C. 127))
The Energy Act 2004 (Commencement No. 7) Order 2006 (S.I. 2006/1964 (C. 66))
The Energy Act 2004 (Commencement No. 8) Order 2007 (S.I. 2007/1091 (C. 47)
The Energy Act 2004 (Commencement No. 9) Order 2009 (S.I. 2009/1269 (C. 67))
The Energy Act 2004 (Commencement No. 10) Order 2010 (S.I. 2010/1889 (C. 98))

Schedule 14
Paragraph 11(b) repealed by Part 2 of Schedule 17 to the Serious Organised Crime and Police Act 2005.

Schedule 15
This Schedule was repealed as to England and Wales by Schedule 28 to the Environmental Permitting (England and Wales) Regulations 2010. Paragraphs 1 to 8 and 10 to 12 were repealed as to Scotland by paragraph 1 of Schedule 7 to the Environmental Authorisations (Scotland) Regulations 2018.

Schedule 16
Paragraph 9(b) was inserted by section 62(19)(b) of the Scotland Act 2016.

References

Sources
"Energy Act 2004". Halsbury's Statutes of England and Wales. Fourth Edition. 2007 Reissue. Volume 33(2). Page 618.
"Energy Act 2004". Current Law Statutes 2004. Sweet & Maxwell. London. W Green. Edinburgh. 2005. Volume 1. Chapter 20.

External links
The Energy Act 2004, as amended from the National Archives.
The Energy Act 2004, as originally enacted from the National Archives.
Explanatory notes to the Energy Act 2004.

United Kingdom Acts of Parliament 2004
Energy law